Kosmos 1285 ( meaning Cosmos 1285) was a Soviet US-K missile early warning satellite which was launched in 1981 as part of the Soviet military's Oko programme. The satellite was designed to identify missile launches using optical telescopes and infrared sensors.

Kosmos 1285 was launched from Site 16/2 at Plesetsk Cosmodrome in the Russian SSR. A Molniya-M carrier rocket with a 2BL upper stage was used to perform the launch, which took place at 00:13 UTC on 4 August 1981. The launch successfully placed the satellite into a molniya orbit. It subsequently received its Kosmos designation, and the international designator 1981-071A. The United States Space Command assigned it the Satellite Catalog Number 12627.

It did not reach working orbit and self-destructed.

See also

 1981 in spaceflight
 List of Kosmos satellites (1251–1500)
 List of Oko satellites
 List of R-7 launches (1980-1984)

References

Kosmos satellites
Oko
Spacecraft launched in 1981
Spacecraft launched by Molniya-M rockets